Aleksandr Sergeyevich Nikitin (27 January 1935 – 5 June 2022) was a Russian chess player, chess coach, theorist; and Master of Sports of the USSR (1952). He was a coach of the Azerbaijan SSR (1980) and the USSR (1986) teams, and was a coach for Garry Kasparov from 1976 to 1990.

Life and career
Aleksandr Nikitin was born in Moscow. He attended and graduated from the Moscow Power Engineering Institute. Afterwards, Nikitin worked on a production at the MPEI Special Design Bureau. 

At the age of 17, Nikitin became a chess master. He participated in a number of championships in Moscow (the best result in 1954 - 2nd-5th place), in an international tournament in Kislovodsk (1966 - 9th place) and in the 1959 USSR Chess Championship. As a member of the USSR team Nikitin won the World University Championships in 1955, 1957 and 1958.

Nikitin retired from chess for a while, concentrating on scientific research, however he came back and became one of the most distinguished chess coaches in history.  

Nikitin made his debut as a coach in 1963, when he and Igor Bondarevsky prepared the USSR student team for the Olympic Games. From 1973 to 1976, he worked for the USSR Sports Committee as the national team coach and was a member of Anatoly Karpov's team, which helped him prepare for his lost World Championship match. There was a conflict between Nikitin and Karpov in 1976 and, as a result, Nikitin was fired from the Sports Committee.    

In 1973, Nikitin got acquainted with Garry Kasparov at the junior tournament. Within the next three years, he consulted Kasparov periodically and from 1976 he was his permanent coach. Ten years later, Kasparov won his fifth and final world championship match against his great rival Anatoly Karpov, but in 1990 Mikitin and Kasparov parted ways.
      
In 1992, Nikitin helped Boris Spassky during his exhibition match with Bobby Fischer. In the late 1990s, he served as the permanent coach of Étienne Bacrot, who became the youngest grandmaster in the world and the multiple champion of France. Niktin also coached Russian grandmaster Dmitry Yakovenko, the individual European champion in 2012, who was fifth in the FIDE world ranking.      

In 1993,  Nikitin was honored with the FIDE title of International Master. He also was given the title of "Honored Coach of the USSR."

In 2019, Nikitin began to work on a book about Grandmaster Evgeni Vasiukov and his life.             

Nikitin died in Moscow on 5 June 2022, at the age of 87.

Writings 

 Nikitin, Aleksandr (1972). Mikhail Chigorin (with Evgeni Vasiukov and Alexander Narkevich) 

 Nikitin, Aleksandr (1994). Sicilian Defense. Scheveningen (with Garry Kasparov)

 Nikitin, Aleksandr (1998). With Kasparov: Move by Move, Year by Year.

 Nikitin, Aleksandr (2020). My Friend Evgeny Vasyukov

References 
Notes

Further reading

 Linder, Isaac Maxovich, Linder, Vladimir Isaakovich (2009). Garry Kasparov. Life and the Game.

 Abramov, Lev Joachimovich and Geiler, Grigory Moiseevich (1964). Chess Dictionary. 

 Karpov, Garry and Anatoly Evgenyevich. Chess: Encyclopedic Dictionary.

External links 
 Personal card of Aleksandr Nikitin at FIDE
 Biography of Aleksandr Nikitin at Chess Federation of Russia
 Chess games of Aleksandr Nikitin at Chessgames.com
 Personal card of Aleksandr Nikitin at 365chess.com
 Personal card of Aleksandr Nikitin at OlimpBase.org

1935 births
2022 deaths
Soviet chess players
Russian chess players
Chess International Masters
Merited Coaches of the Soviet Union
Chess theoreticians
Moscow Power Engineering Institute alumni
Sportspeople from Moscow
Chess coaches